North Broughton Island is an island in the Broughton Archipelago, located as its name suggests to the north of Broughton Island in the Queen Charlotte Strait region of the Central Coast of British Columbia, Canada.

Broughton Point is on the south coast of the island, facing Broughton Island at

See also
Broughton (disambiguation)
Broughton Island (disambiguation)

References

Islands of British Columbia
Central Coast of British Columbia